Marcus Kemp (born August 14, 1995) is an American football wide receiver and special teamer for the Washington Commanders of the National Football League (NFL). He played college football at Hawaii before singing with the Kansas City Chiefs as an undrafted free agent in 2017. Kemp has also been a member of the Miami Dolphins and New York Giants.

College career
Kemp attended and played college football at Hawaii. He was selected to the team’s leadership council and was the recipient of the Alec Waterhouse Most Valuable Player Award at the annual Na Koa football banquet at Hawaii.

Professional career

Kansas City Chiefs
Kemp was signed by the Kansas City Chiefs as an undrafted free agent on May 6, 2017. He was waived on September 2, 2017, and was signed to the Chiefs' practice squad the next day. He was signed to the active roster on October 14, 2017. He was waived on October 16, 2017, and was re-signed back to the practice squad. He was signed back to the active roster on January 2, 2018.

On August 20, 2019, he was placed on injured reserve with a torn ACL and MCL. Without Kemp, the Chiefs won Super Bowl LIV against the San Francisco 49ers. He was re-signed on August 19, 2020. He was waived on October 6, 2020, and signed to the practice squad two days later. He was elevated to the active roster on October 19, October 24, and October 31 for the team's weeks 6, 7, and 8 games against the Buffalo Bills, Denver Broncos, and New York Jets, and reverted to the practice squad following each game. He recorded his second career reception in week 6. He was promoted to the active roster on November 28, 2020. He was waived on December 15, 2020.

Miami Dolphins
On December 22, 2020, Kemp was signed to the Miami Dolphins' practice squad. He was elevated to the active roster on January 2, 2021, for the team's week 17 game against the Buffalo Bills, and reverted to the practice squad after the game. His practice squad contract with the team expired after the season on January 11, 2021.

Kansas City Chiefs (second stint)
On January 12, 2021, Kemp signed with the practice squad of the Kansas City Chiefs. He was elevated to the active roster on January 23 and February 6 for the AFC Championship Game against the Buffalo Bills and Super Bowl LV against the Tampa Bay Buccaneers, and reverted to the practice squad after each game. His practice squad contract with the team expired after the season on February 16, 2021.

Kemp re-signed with the Chiefs on March 9, 2021. He was released on August 31, 2021. He was re-signed the following day. He was placed on the Reserve/COVID-19 list on November 18, 2021.

New York Giants
On July 26, 2022, the New York Giants signed Kemp. On August 24, 2022, Kemp was placed on injured reserve with a hamstring injury. He was released on August 30.

Kansas City Chiefs (third stint)
On October 3, 2022, Kemp was signed to the Kansas City Chiefs practice squad.

In the 2022 AFC championship game, Kemp caught a crucial first-down pass from Patrick Mahomes. In his post-game press conference, Mahomes cited his work with Kemp on the 2017 Chiefs practice squad as a reason he felt comfortable with Kemp on the field.  Kemp won his second Super Bowl ring when the Chiefs defeated the Philadelphia Eagles in Super Bowl LVII. He did not record a catch but had several key blocks on a record setting 66 yard punt return by Kadarius Toney.

Washington Commanders
On March 3, 2023, Kemp signed with the Washington Commanders.

References

External links
Washington Commanders bio
Hawaii Rainbow Warriors bio

1995 births
Living people
American football wide receivers
Hawaii Rainbow Warriors football players
Kansas City Chiefs players
Miami Dolphins players
New York Giants players
People from Layton, Utah
Players of American football from Utah
Washington Commanders players